The Inuit Circumpolar Council (ICC), formerly Inuit Circumpolar Conference, is a multinational non-governmental organization (NGO) and Indigenous Peoples' Organization (IPO) representing the 180,000 Inuit, Yupik, and Chukchi peoples (sometimes referred to as Eskimo) people living in Alaska (United States), Canada, Greenland (Kingdom of Denmark), and Chukotka (Russia). ICC was ECOSOC-accredited and was granted special consultative status (category II) at the UN in 1983.

The Conference, which first met in June 1977 in Barrow, Alaska (now Utqiaġvik), initially represented Native Peoples from Canada, Alaska and Greenland. In 1980 the charter and by-laws of ICC were adopted. The Conference agreed to replace the term Eskimo with the term Inuit. This has not however met with widespread acceptance by some groups, most pre-eminently the Yupik (see Background section below). The goals of the Conference are to strengthen ties between Arctic people and to promote human, cultural, political and environmental rights and polities at the international level.

ICC holds a General Assembly every four years. ICC is one of the six Arctic indigenous communities to have the status of Permanent Participant on the Arctic Council.

Background
The Inuit population includes the following groups and regions: 
Canada: Nunavut, the Inuvialuit (Northwest Territories), Nunavik (Northern Quebec), and Nunatsiavut (Labrador) 
United States (Alaska): the Iñupiat and Yupik
Greenland: the Kalaallit, Inughuit and Tunumiit
Russia (Chukchi Peninsula): the Siberian Yupik and Chukchi

All of these peoples are sometimes collectively referred to by the exonym Eskimo, the use of which is frowned upon by many of the Inuit, especially in eastern Canada. ICC uses the term Inuit to refer to them all, which has its own problems. One of those is administrative: an Inuk in the United States could be considered "Native American," "Alaskan Native" or "Aboriginal American." The Yupik of both Alaska and Russia generally prefer being called Yupik. Inuit is currently used in Alaska but it is not a word in the Yupik languages, nor a word which they traditionally used to describe themselves. Eskimo, which was formerly used in Alaska is generally dying out.

Structure and functions
The main goals of the organization are to strengthen unity among Inuit, to promote their human rights (Indigenous and linguistic) and interests, and to ensure the development of Inuit culture.

Structurally, the organization is made up of four separate offices in each of the four Inuit nations, chartered individually under their national rules. The Presidents of ICC Chukotka, ICC Alaska, ICC Canada, and ICC Greenland, along with one Executive Council Member elected from each of the nations, make up the eight-member ICC Executive Council. The Executive Council is presided over by an International Chair (formerly International President—the title was changed in 2002).

ICC holds a General Assembly every four years, bringing together Inuit from across the northern circumpolar region to discuss issues of international importance to their communities, provide direction for the work of the organization over the next four years, and divide responsibility for issue areas between the national offices. Assembly delegates appoint an international chair from the General Assembly host-country, along with the members of the Executive Council, and develop policies and resolutions for the coming term.

The General Assembly, and thus the International Chair position, rotates between the four Inuit nations quadrennially at the General Assemblies. At the 2002 General Assembly in Kuujjuaq, Nunavik, Canada, the Chair passed from Greenland, where it had been held for the previous seven years by Aqqaluk Lynge, now a member of the United Nations Permanent Forum on Indigenous Issues, to Canada, where Sheila Watt-Cloutier, formerly the President of ICC Canada, took the position.

In 2006, the Chair passed to ICC Alaska at the General Assembly in Barrow, and was then occupied by Patricia L. Cochran, formerly executive director of the Alaska Native Science Commission. At that Assembly, ICC also voted to change its name to Inuit Circumpolar Council as there has been perennial confusion over an organizational name that sounds more like a past meeting.

Chairs
Sara Olsvig (2022 - present)
Dalee Sambo Dorough (2018-2022)
Okalik Eegeesiak (2014-2018)
Aqqaluk Lynge (2010-2014)
James Stotts (2009-2010)
Patricia Cochran (2006-2009)
Sheila Watt-Cloutier (2002-2006)
Aqqaluk Lynge (1997-2002)
Rosemary Kuptana (1995-1997)
Caleb Pungowiyi (1992-1995)
Mary Simon (1986-1992)
Hans-Pavia Rosing (1980-1986)

See also

Arctic Council
Saami Council
West Nordic Council
Arctic cooperation and politics
United Nations Permanent Forum on Indigenous Issues
International Day of the World's Indigenous Peoples
Working Group on Indigenous Populations
Indigenous and Tribal Populations Convention, 1957
Indigenous and Tribal Peoples Convention
Declaration on the Rights of Indigenous Peoples

References

External links

Inuit Circumpolar Council, Alaska
Inuit Circumpolar Council, Canada
Inuit Circumpolar Council, Greenland
Inuit Circumpolar Council, Chukotka 

Circumpolar Conference
Ethnic organizations based in the United States
Indigenous organizations in Russia
Organizations based in the United States
Organisations based in Greenland
Government of the Arctic
Organizations established in 1977
Indigenous rights organizations in Canada